In oceanography, a gyre is any large system of circulating ocean currents, particularly those involved with large wind movements. Gyres are caused by the Coriolis effect; planetary vorticity, horizontal friction and vertical friction determine the circulatory patterns from the wind stress curl (torque).

Gyre can refer to any type of vortex in an atmosphere or a sea, even one that is human-created, but it is most commonly used in terrestrial oceanography to refer to the major ocean systems.

Major gyres 
The following are the five most notable ocean gyres:
 Indian Ocean Gyre
 North Atlantic Gyre
 North Pacific Gyre
 South Atlantic Gyre
 South Pacific Gyre

They flow clockwise in the Northern hemisphere, and counterclockwise in the Southern hemisphere.

Other gyres

Tropical gyres 

Tropical gyres are less unified and tend to be mostly east–west with minor north–south extent.
 Atlantic Equatorial Current System (two counter-rotating circulations)
 Pacific Equatorial Current System
 Indian Monsoon Gyres (two counter-rotating circulations in northern Indian Ocean)

Subtropical gyres 
Subtropical gyres are formed by an intricate process involving both Coriolis force and Ekman transport. As global winds, caused by Earth's rotation, blow across the ocean surface they are acted upon by Coriolis causing movement to the right in the Northern Hemisphere and to the left in the Southern Hemisphere. These winds cause frictional surface currents as the wind transfers energy to the ocean allowing the water to move in a circular motion. As Ekman transport acts on these circular currents the net transport of water is actually 90 degrees which drives regions of convergence, allowing water to pile up in the center of the ocean basin forming a bulge.

The center of a subtropical gyre is a high pressure zone, while the outer edges of the gyre are a low pressure zone. This difference in pressure causes a pressure gradient allowing the diffusion of water from the high pressure zone in the bulge to the low pressure zone on the outer edges of the gyre.The movement of water does not flow directly down the bulge in the center but around it due to Coriolis causing circulation around the high pressure zone in a clockwise motion in the northern hemisphere and a counterclockwise motion in the southern hemisphere.Thus, Resulting in the rotation of the gyre. The gyre has a stable circulation of water around it due to the exact balance between Ekman force and Coriolis. These gyres contribute to the Geostrophic Flow of the ocean resulting in the overall Ocean circulation model of the Earth. The movement of subtropical gyres cause areas of downwelling in the ocean resulting in regions of lower productivity. 

This build-up of water in the center creates flow towards the equator in the upper  of the ocean, through rather complex dynamics. This flow is returned towards the pole in an intensified western boundary current. The boundary current of the North Atlantic Gyre is the Gulf Stream, of the North Pacific Gyre the Kuroshio Current, of the South Atlantic Gyre the Brazil Current, of the South Pacific Gyre the East Australian Current, and of the Indian Ocean Gyre the Agulhas Current.

Subpolar gyres 

Subpolar gyres form at high latitudes (around 60°). Circulation of surface wind and ocean water is counterclockwise in the Northern Hemisphere, around a low-pressure area, such as the persistent Aleutian Low and the Icelandic Low. Surface currents generally move outward from the center of the system. This drives the Ekman transport, which creates an upwelling of nutrient-rich water from the lower depths.

Subpolar circulation in the southern hemisphere is dominated by the Antarctic Circumpolar Current, due to the lack of large landmasses breaking up the Southern Ocean. There are minor gyres in the Weddell Sea and the Ross Sea, the Weddell Gyre and Ross Gyre, which circulate in a clockwise direction.

Biological desert

Gyres are sometimes described as "ocean deserts" or more precisely "biological deserts", a concept that uses the concept of desert in the sense of an environment lacking life and not necessarily water. Other places that are called oceanic deserts are hypoxic or anoxic waters such as dead zones.

Climate change 
Ocean circulation re-distributes the heat and water-resources, therefore determines the regional climate. For example, the western branches of the subtropical gyres flow from the lower latitudes towards higher latitudes, bringing relatively warm and moist air to the adjacent land, contributing to a mild and wet climate (e.g., East China, Japan). In contrast, the eastern boundary currents of the subtropical gyres streaming from the higher latitudes towards lower latitudes, corresponding to a relatively cold and dry climate (e.g., California).

Currently, the core of the subtropical gyres are around 30° in both Hemispheres. However, their positions were not always there. Satellite observational sea surface height and sea surface temperature data suggest that the world's major ocean gyres are slowly moving towards higher latitudes in the past few decades. Such feature show agreement with climate model prediction under anthropogenic global warming. Paleo-climate reconstruction also suggest that during the past cold climate intervals, i.e., ice ages, some of the western boundary currents (western branches of the subtropical ocean gyres) are closer to the equator than their modern positions. These evidence implies that global warming is very likely to push the large-scale ocean gyres towards higher latitudes.

The influence of the Coriolis effect on westward intensification

Pollution

See also 

 Anticyclone
 Cyclone
 Ecosystem of the North Pacific Subtropical Gyre
 Eddy
 Fluid dynamics
 Geostrophic current
 Skookumchuck
 Volta do mar
 Whirlpool

References

External links 

 5 Gyres – Understanding Plastic Marine Pollution
 Wind Driven Surface Currents: Gyres
 SIO 210: Introduction to Physical Oceanography – Global circulation
 SIO 210: Introduction to Physical Oceanography – Wind-forced circulation notes
 SIO 210: Introduction to Physical Oceanography – Lecture 6
 Physical Geography – Surface and Subsurface Ocean Currents
 North Pacific Gyre Oscillation — Georgia Institute of Technology
 

Aerodynamics
Fluid dynamics
Oceanic gyres
Fisheries science